Gaston Xavier Mendy (born 22 November 1985) is a Senegalese former footballer who played as a defender.

Career 
The midfielder started his career in the youth side of ASC Jeanne d'Arc. He joined in spring 2004 to Panthers Dakar and played his first professional season. In summer 2005 was sold to Portuguese III Divisão Serie A side Desportivo de Monção. He played one only one cap for Desportivo Monção and signed than one year later with GD Estoril Praia. Mendy scored in 25 games, two goals and moved than to Romanian Divizia A club Farul Constanţa. He played three years for Farul Constanța and played the 2009/2010 season for the club in the Liga 2 Seria I. After 29 matches in the 2009/2010 for Farul in the second league of Romanian football, signed on 20 July 2010 for FC Universitatea Cluj. On 16 August 2012 signed a two-year contract with FC Petrolul Ploiești.

Honours
Dunărea Călărași
Liga II: 2017–18

References

External links
 
 
 

Living people
1985 births
Senegalese footballers
Association football defenders
Liga Portugal 2 players
Liga I players
Czech First League players
Liga II players
G.D. Estoril Praia players
FCV Farul Constanța players
FC Universitatea Cluj players
FC Petrolul Ploiești players
FC Rapid București players
FK Mladá Boleslav players
ASA 2013 Târgu Mureș players
FC Dunărea Călărași players
Senegalese expatriate footballers
Senegalese expatriate sportspeople in Portugal
Expatriate footballers in Portugal
Senegalese expatriate sportspeople in Romania
Expatriate footballers in Romania
Senegalese expatriate sportspeople in the Czech Republic
Expatriate footballers in the Czech Republic